Sophie Watillon (7 December 1965 – 31 August 2005) was a Belgian viol player who specialized in Baroque music. She was born in Namur, Belgium to a musical family. During her young life, the viola da gamba-soloist gained international fame with refined and sensitive solo interpretations of Early Music and Baroque compositions for viola da gamba.

At the age of sixteen, she began studying music with Philippe Pierlot in Maastricht, and then further with Wieland Kuijken in Brussels and with Paolo Pandolfo at Schola Cantorum Basiliensis, Basel.

Besides her solo career, Watillon was a permanent member of Hesperion XXI, La Capella Reial de Catalunya and Le Concert des Nations of Jordi Savall.  She played with various ensembles such as Il Seminario Musicale, Cantus Cölln, Le Poème Harmonique, Ricercar Consort, Stylus Phantasticus.

Academic career 
 Professor, viola da gamba, Catalonia College of Music, Barcelona

Recordings 
(labels: Alpha - Summit records - Ligia Digital - Ricercar - Cyprès)

 Recordings with Philippe Herreweghe
 Numerous recordings with Hesperion XXI, La Capella Reial de Catalunya and Le Concert des Nations, Jordi Savall

Recordings with Ricercar Consort 
 1988 : Deutsche Barock Kantaten (III) (Schein, Tunder, Buxtehude)
 1989 : Deutsche Barock Kantaten (V) (Hammerschmidt, Selle Schein, Schütz, Tunder, Weckmann, Lübeck)
 1989 : Motets à deux voix of Henri Dumont
 1992 : Die familie Bach (with Collegium Vocale and Capella Sancti Michaelis)
 1995 : Matthäus Passion (1672) of Johann Sebastiani (Deutsche Barock Kantaten XI)

Recordings done under the direction of Sophie Watillon 
 1994 : The Art of the Viola bastarda, song and dance in music for viol in Italy
 Ortiz: Improvisations and Recercadas on La Folia, Doulce mémoire, The Passamezzo Antico, The Passamezzo Moderno
 Sandrin: Doulce mémoire
 Ruffa: La Danza, La Piva, La Gamba
 Rore: Ancor che co'l partire
 Dalla Casa: Rognoni
 Bassani: Cosi le chiome
 Bonizzi: Hellas comment
 Selma Y Salaverde: Vestiva i colli
 Corelli: Sonata La Follia, op. 5, no. 12
 2000 : Pièces de viole - Pièces de Théorbe of Nicolas Hotman
 2003 : Marin Marais - La Rêveuse, & Autres Pièces de Viole

Recordings with Le Poème Harmonique 
 1999 : L'Humaine Comédie of Estienne Moulinié
 2002 : Le Consert des Consorts of Pierre Guédron

Recordings with Stylus Phantasticus 
 2001 : Zeichen im Himmel of Philipp Heinrich Erlebach

References

External links 
 Abeille Info
 Alpha records

Belgian performers of early music
Viol players
1965 births
2005 deaths
Walloon people
People from Namur (city)
20th-century classical musicians
Belgian women musicians
20th-century women musicians
Women performers of early music
20th-century Belgian musicians
21st-century classical musicians
21st-century Belgian musicians
21st-century women musicians